Yallourn Football Club was an Australian Rules Football Club based in Yallourn, Victoria, which ran from 1921 to 1976.

History
Yallourn Football Club
The first documented football match that Yallourn FC was involved in was a practice match against Morwell in 1921.

In 1922, Yallourn were admitted into the Central Gippsland Football Association. Reg Anthony was elected as captain.

Between 1937 and 1940 Yallourn entered two teams into the Central Gippsland Football Association, under the names of Yallourn Blue and Yallourn Gold, with Yallourn Blue winning the 1939 Central Gippsland Football Association premiership.

In 1947, Yallourn had two sides in the Central Gippsland Football League Seconds competition, Yallourn and Yallourn Youths.

Yallourn FC and Yallourn North FC merged in 1977 to form the Yallourn Yallourn North FC.

Yallourn North Football Club

The Yallourn North FC commenced playing in 1948 in the Mid Gippsland Football League after the Brown Coal Mine Imperials and Brown Coal Mine Rovers teams merged and changed their name to the Yallourn North FC.

Yallourn FC and Yallourn North FC's merged in 1977 to form Yallourn Yallourn North FC, who played in the Mid Gippsland Football League up until 2019. In 2021 YYNFC joined the Gippsland Football League.

Premierships
Mid Gippsland Football League
1950 1963, 1972.

Yallourn Imperials Football Club
The Yallourn Imperials Football Club first competed in the Morwell & Yallourn Football Association in 1932.
The “Imps” eventually folded just prior to the 1940 season, due to many players enlisting in the Army.
Football Timeline
Morwell & Yallourn Football Association
1932 to 1934
Mid Gippsland Football League
1935 to 1939

Football Timeline

 1922 to 1931: Central Gippsland Football Association
 1932 to 1935: Gippsland Football League
 1936 to 1940: Central Gippsland Football Association
 1941 to 1943: Club to recess due to World War Two
 1944 to 1945: Central Gippsland Wartime Football League
 1946 to 1953: Central Gippsland Football League

Yallourn FC Premierships

Central Gippsland Football League
1925, 1926, 1928, 1931, 1936, 1939, 1948
Gippsland Football League
1932, 1933
Central Gippsland Wartime Football League
1944
Victory Day Lightening Premiership
1946

VFL Players
The following footballers played with Yallourn FC prior to playing VFL football
1928 - Bill Churchill - South Melbourne
1933 - Jack Sambell - Melbourne
1938 - Fred Godfrey - Footscray
1939 - Bill Green - Essendon
1940 - Ken Williams - Collingwood
1943 - Stan Attenborough - North Melbourne
1944 - Doug Williams - Carlton
1945 - Don Benson - Richmond
1946 - George Card - Geelong
1947 - Syd Tate - Geelong
1948 - Geoff Collins - Melbourne
1949 - Jim Shaw - Melbourne
1953 - Lloyd Brewer - Richmond
1955 - John Paice - Carlton
1956 - Peter Cook - Melbourne
1957 - John Hutchinson - Fitzroy
1963 - Tom Garland - Richmond
1964 - Garry Crane - Carlton
1967 - Gavin Smith - Fitzroy
1971 - Colin Dell - Footscray
1978 - Steve Emery - Hawthorn
1991 - Scott Lee - Adelaide

The following footballers played/coached with Yallourn FC after playing senior VFL football, with the year indicating their first season at Yallourn.
1926 - Jim Lawn - Collingwood
1930 - Vince Irwin - Essendon
1946 - Frank Kelly - Collingwood
1949 - Ted Hill - Collingwood
1950 - Les Jones - Richmond
1951 - Reg Baker - Collingwood
1959? - Vic Lawrence - North Melbourne
1964 - Mike Collins - Melbourne

References

Australian rules football clubs in Victoria (Australia)
North West Tasmania
Australian rules football clubs established in 1921